Westmount Public School may refer to:

 Westmount Public School (Sudbury, ON)
 Westmount Public School (Peterborough, ON)
 Westmount Public School (London, ON)